Henry Worgan Marshal, (27 June 1900 at Santa Maria, Colombia – 6 January 1970 at Ullesthorpe, Leicestershire, England) played cricket in first-class matches for Argentina against touring sides from England, and for the South American team that toured England in 1932. He also represented Argentina in non-first-class international matches against Chile.

Educated at Oundle School, Marshal was a right-handed opening batsman, and also acted as wicketkeeper in several of his first-class matches. He made his first-class debut in four matches against an MCC side in 1926-27, scoring 105 on his debut. He also played for Argentina in 1929-30 against a touring side under Sir Julien Cahn.

His biggest innings came for the South American side in England. In the first first-class match, against Oxford University, Marshal made 153 in four-and-a-half hours. Wisden Cricketers' Almanack reported that he "scarcely lifted the ball at all and did not give a chance". The innings was highest of the tour by any batsman in any match, first-class or non-first-class. On the tour as a whole, Marshal scored 255 first-class runs at an average of 31.87 runs per innings; including other matches, his aggregate was 652 runs at 34.31, and he made a second century, 101 not out, in a non-first-class match against the South American Banks at Teddington.

Marshal played in domestic Argentine cricket into his 40s.

References 
 Henry Marshal at www.cricketarchive.com contains details of first-class and other matches, complete career statistics and scorecards
 Wisden Cricketers' Almanack, 1933 edition, page 508-520, reports on the South American tour to England in 1932.

Notes 

1900 births
1970 deaths
Argentine cricketers
South Americans cricketers
Wicket-keepers